This was the first edition of the women's tournament.

Ylena In-Albon won the title, defeating Zhang Kailin in the final, 6–2, 6–3.

Seeds

Draw

Finals

Top half

Bottom half

References

External links
Main Draw

Shimadzu All Japan Indoor Tennis Championships - Singles
All Japan Indoor Tennis Championships